Wagawattage Maithree Bathiya Perera (born 28 April 1977) is a former Sri Lankan first class cricketer. A right-handed batsman and part-time leg break bowler, he has represented Sri Lanka A at international level.

Perera impressed in the under 23 and the premier tournaments of 2001/02 and 2002/03 where he was the highest runs scorer for both seasons. As a member of Sri Lanka A he has toured South Africa and played in the ICC six nation tournament in Namibia, New Zealand and the UK. In domestic cricket he has played for Colts Cricket Club, Colombo Cricket Club and Moors Sports Club. He has also spent time in the Australian Cricket Academy in Adelaide.

References

External links

Sri Lankan cricketers
1977 births
Living people
Moors Sports Club cricketers
Colombo Cricket Club cricketers
Colts Cricket Club cricketers
Kandurata cricketers